FC Bulat Cherepovets was a Russian football team from Cherepovets. It played professionally in 1960–1970, 1979–1986 and 1989–1996. Their best result was 2nd place in Zone 1 of the Soviet First League in 1961 (they played on that level from 1960 to 1962).

Team name history
 1960–1978: FC Metallurg Cherepovets
 1979–1988: FC Stroitel Cherepovets
 1989–1991: FC Khimik Cherepovets
 1992–1996: FC Bulat Cherepovets

External links
  Team history at KLISF

Association football clubs established in 1960
Association football clubs disestablished in 1997
Defunct football clubs in Russia
Sport in Cherepovets
1960 establishments in Russia
1997 disestablishments in Russia